David Nicholas Yip (born 4 June 1951) is a British actor and playwright. He gained prominence through his role in the BBC series The Chinese Detective (1981–1982) as the first East Asian lead on British television.

His films include A View to a Kill (1985), Ping Pong (1986), and Break (2020). Yip wrote and starred in the play Gold Mountain. On television, he appeared in the Channel 4 soap opera Brookside (1989–1990), the CBBC series Spirit Warriors (2010), and the Sky Atlantic thriller Fortitude (2017–2018). He is also known for his voice work.

Yip has given talks and presented documentaries on the Chinese community in his hometown of Liverpool. In 2022, he was awarded honorary doctorates by the University of Essex and Edge Hill University.

Early life
Yip was born in Liverpool to a Chinese father, a seaman from Canton, and an English mother from Liverpool. He was one of eight children and had a working class upbringing.

After leaving school at 16, Yip worked as a shipping clerk for British Railways for 2 years. At 18, he was offered a job as an assistant stage manager by Teresa Collard at the Neptune Theatre. He participated in local youth productions while working at the Everyman, including one under the direction of Barry Kyle when he was visiting the Liverpool Playhouse. Yip's peers encouraged him to audition for drama school. He got into East 15 Acting School and went on to complete his training in 1973.

Career
Yip began his career in theatre. He first appeared on television in an episode of the ITV game show Whodunnit? and the BBC television film Savages in 1975, and an episode of the BBC sitcom It Ain't Half Hot Mum in 1978. In 1979, Yip played Frank Chen in the science fiction series Quatermass, also on ITV, and had a small part in the Doctor Who story "Destiny of the Daleks".

From 1981 to 1982, Yip starred as the titular detective John Ho in the BBC police procedural The Chinese Detective, making him the first East Asian lead on British television. In a 2022 retrospective of 100 BBC gamechangers, the British Film Institute called Yip's performance "pensive and affecting". After watching him the series, director Steven Spielberg cast Yip in the opening scene of Indiana Jones and the Temple of Doom as the Jones' past companion Wu Han, marking Yip's feature film debut. This was followed by a supporting role as CIA liaison agent Chuck Lee in the 1985 James Bond film A View to a Kill and a lead role as Mike Wong in the 1986 mystery comedy film Ping Pong.

Yip played Michael Choì in the Channel 4 soap opera Brookside from 1989 to 1990. In 1990, he appeared as a contestant on Cluedo, facing off against comedian Tony Slattery. He starred in the 1993 BBC sitcom Every Silver Lining and appeared in the television adaptation of Wilde Justice. This was followed by small roles in the films Goodbye Hong Kong (1994), Hamlet (1996), Fast Food (1998), and Entrapment (1999). He played Assad in the two-parter Arabian Nights, Merv in the film My Kingdom (2001), and Dr Pang in the CBBC series Oscar Charlie.

Yip starred alongside Chipo Chung and Gemma Chan in a production of Turandot. Yip wrote a play entitled Gold Mountain, based on his father's life. It was intended for the Liverpool Capital of Culture 2008 event, but was delayed due to writing problems. It premiered on 6 October 2010, at the Unity Theatre, Liverpool, and was performed again in 2012.

Also in 2010, Yip played Ding-Xiang in the CBBC series Spirit Warriors. In 2013, Yip joined the cast of feature film All That Remains which was released on 5 May 2016. He reunited with Gemma Chan from Turandot in the play Yellow Face at the Park Theatre and then National Theatre.

From 2017 to 2018, Yip returned to the National Theatre for The Great Wave, led the play Eastern Star at the Tara Theatre, and played Hong Mankyo in the Sky Atlantic psychological thriller Fortitude. He also had a voice role on the ABC Kids animated series Luo Bao Bei. He starred in the 2020 thriller film Break.

Personal life
Yip is a practising Nichiren Buddhist and a member of the Soka Gakkai International. He lives in north Oxfordshire near Banbury with his wife Virginia and their dog Buddy. His brother Stephen Yip stood as an independent candidate in the 2021 Liverpool mayoral election.

He only adopted his Chinese name, coined by friends, as an adult whilst working on a movie in Hong Kong.

Filmography

Film

Television

Video games

Stage

Audio

References

External links

Living people
1951 births
20th-century English male actors
21st-century English dramatists and playwrights
21st-century English male actors
Alumni of East 15 Acting School
British male actors of Chinese descent
British writers of Chinese descent
Dramatists and playwrights from Liverpool
English male dramatists and playwrights
English male film actors
English male Shakespearean actors
English male stage actors
English male television actors
English male voice actors
English people of Chinese descent
Labour Party (UK) people
Male actors from Liverpool
Members of Sōka Gakkai